Michael Nicholas Nolan (May 4, 1833 – May 31, 1905) was a U.S. Representative from New York State and Mayor of Albany, New York, the state capital.

Biography
Nolan was born in County Carlow, Ireland. and immigrated to the United States at the age of ten. He attended the public schools in Albany.  He studied with a local attorney but went to California during the Gold Rush without attaining admission to the bar.

Career
In California, Nolan was employed on the street railway system of San Francisco and soon became manager.

Nolan returned to Albany where he was a partner in a brewery, became director of the National Savings Bank of Albany, and served as fire commissioner of Albany from 1869 to 1878. Elected as a Democrat, he was mayor of Albany from May 1878 to June 24, 1883, when he resigned.

Elected to the 47th United States Congress representing the Sixteenth District of New York, Nolan served from March 4, 1881, to March 3, 1883.   After leaving Congress he continued his business activities, and served as Mayor of Albany again from 1882 to 1883.

Death
Nolan died in Albany on May 31, 1905 (age 72 years, 27 days). He is interred at St. Agnes Cemetery, Menands, New York.

References

External links

Michael Nicholas Nolan entry at The Political Graveyard

1833 births
1905 deaths
Politicians from County Carlow
People from County Carlow
American Roman Catholics
Irish emigrants to the United States (before 1923)
Mayors of Albany, New York
Burials at St. Agnes Cemetery
Democratic Party members of the United States House of Representatives from New York (state)
19th-century American politicians